Johannes-Franciscus Bonfrère (born 15 June 1946) is a Dutch football coach and former midfielder who spent his playing career with MVV Maastricht. In a long coaching career Bonfrère managed several teams in Africa and Asia. He guided Nigeria to their victory in the 1996 Olympic Games.

Playing career
Between 1963 and 1985 Bonfrère scored 50 goals in 335 league appearances for MVV Maastricht, his only club.

Coaching career

Nigeria
Bonfrère led Nigeria national football team to the 1996 Summer Olympics gold medal in Atlanta, Georgia. He was the coach of Al Ahly in Egypt in 2002/03 where he lost the league at the final match with a difference of two points. His contract was terminated after that.

He also led Nigeria to the 2000 African Cup of Nations co-hosted by Nigeria and Ghana. Bonfrère led the Nigerian team to the finals, where they lost to Cameroon by penalties.

On 7 June 2018, Jo was offered a 3 bedroom apartment by the Nigerian government as part of the promise made by late General Sanni Abacha after winning the gold medal at the Atlanta Olympics for Nigeria.

Asia and South Korea
He was hired to coach the South Korea national football team in June 2004 to replace Humberto Coelho, who was forced to quit after a draw with the Maldives national football team in a FIFA World Cup qualification. The Dutch coach got off to a promising start by crushing a highly rated German squad of World Cup stars such as Michael Ballack and Oliver Kahn, 3–1, with a young Korean team in a friendly match in December 2004. In 2005, South Korea qualified for the 2006 FIFA World Cup under him, but a string of disappointing losses thereafter fueled fan and media ire against Bonfrère. He resigned on 23 August that year after poor results in the East Asian Football Championship and a World Cup qualifier loss against Saudi Arabia. Korea Football Association then hired Dick Advocaat as its third Dutch coach, and Advocaat angered his predecessor by saying he will be another Guus Hiddink, not Bonfrère.

Bonfrère joined former Chinese Super League champions Dalian Shide on a one-year contract in the 2007 league season. Despite the team finishing fifth in the league, they were never in contention to win the title and opted not to extend his contract. On 29 June 2011, another Chinese Super League club Henan Construction announced that Bonfrère would lead the team on a 1+1 contract and fight for staying in the Super League.

In February 2015, Bonfrère was added to the MVV youth team staff.

On 25 May 2017, China League One club Baoding Yingli ETS signed a one-year contract with Bonfrère.

References

1946 births
Living people
People from Eijsden-Margraten
Dutch people of French descent
Association football midfielders
Dutch footballers
Eredivisie players
MVV Maastricht players
Dutch football managers
MVV Maastricht managers
Nigeria national football team managers
Qatar national football team managers
Al Wahda FC managers
United Arab Emirates national football team managers
Al Ahly SC managers
South Korea national football team managers
Dalian Shide F.C. managers
Henan Songshan Longmen F.C. managers
Dutch expatriate football managers
Dutch expatriate sportspeople in Nigeria
Dutch expatriate sportspeople in the United Arab Emirates
Dutch expatriate sportspeople in South Korea
Expatriate football managers in Belgium
Expatriate football managers in Nigeria
Expatriate football managers in Qatar
Expatriate football managers in the United Arab Emirates
Expatriate football managers in Egypt
Expatriate football managers in South Korea
Expatriate football managers in China
1991 FIFA Women's World Cup managers
2004 AFC Asian Cup managers
Medalists at the 1996 Summer Olympics
Olympic gold medalists for Nigeria
2000 African Cup of Nations managers
Nigeria women's national football team managers
Footballers from Limburg (Netherlands)
Dutch expatriate sportspeople in Qatar
Dutch expatriate sportspeople in China
Dutch expatriate sportspeople in Egypt
Dutch expatriate sportspeople in Belgium